Niklas May (born 10 April 2002) is a German professional footballer who plays as a midfielder for  club Viktoria Köln.

References

2000 births
Living people
German footballers
Sportspeople from Freiberg
Footballers from Saxony
Association football midfielders
RB Leipzig players
FC Viktoria Köln players
3. Liga players